Minster Yard is a street in the city centre of York, England. It runs along the southern, eastern and northeastern sides of York Minster, for which it is named.

History
The street may have originated as the courtyard of the headquarters building of Roman Eboracum.  In the 8th-century text The Earliest Life of Gregory the Great, a square between the royal palace and York Minster was mentioned, which has been tentatively identified with Minster Yard.  However, in the 10th-century, the area was covered by a cemetery associated with the minster.

In the late 11th century, York Minster was rebuilt on a new site, and Minster Yard, immediately south of the building, was paved.  At the time, it provided a through route.  It fell within the Minster Close, which was walled in 1283, and after the Minster was rebuilt and extended in 1365, it became a dead-end, accessed through one of two gates, by Lop Lane and Minster Gates.

The deanery of the Minster was built on the street, and the Peter Prison next to it.  From 1828 to 1832, these were demolished, along with the gateways, opening up the area, and in 1903, Deangate was created, once again providing a route out of the street, to the south-east.

A Roman column excavated from under the Minster in 1969, now stands in the street, in front of the Minster School, and in 1998, a statue of Constantine the Great was erected.

Layout and architecture
thumb|left|Looking east along Minster Yard towards Deangate
The street runs south-east from its junction with High Petergate, Duncombe Place and Precentor's Court, past a junction with Minster Gates, to its junction with Deangate.  It then becomes a footpath and turns north-east, until it meets College Street, at College Green.  Finally, it turns north-west, running past a junction with Chapter House Street, past York Deanery at 1A, through a gate, to a dead-end section running alongside Dean's Park.

The north side of the street is taken up with the south and east fronts of York Minster.  On the south side of the road lie Minster Court, the early-17th-century Treasurer's House, the 18th-century 4 Minster Yard, 5 Minster Yard (with a core built about 1300), the mid-18th century Old Residence and 7 Minster Yard. Passing the southern tip of Deangate, there stands, at 8 Minster Yard, The Minster School, the mid-18th-century 10 Minster Yard and 9 Minster Gates, the parish room for St Michael le Belfrey at 11–12 Minster Yard, followed by the church itself.

References